Katharine Isobel Murray (born November 2, 1981), known professionally as Katharine Isabelle, is a Canadian actress. She has been described as a scream queen due to her roles in various horror films. She started her acting career in 1989, playing a small role in the television series MacGyver. She gained fame for the role of Ginger Fitzgerald in the films Ginger Snaps, Ginger Snaps 2: Unleashed, and Ginger Snaps Back: The Beginning.

In 2014 Katharine Isabelle was awarded the Fangoria Chainsaw Award for Best Actress for her role as Mary Mason in the Canadian body horror film American Mary.

Personal life
Katharine Isabelle Murray was born on November 2, 1981, in Vancouver, British Columbia. Her parents are Graeme Murray, a production designer who has won two Emmy Awards for work on The X-Files, and Gail Johnson Murray, a writer and producer. Her paternal grandparents and maternal grandfather are from Scotland. Her paternal half-brother is Joshua Murray, a director and former actor.

Despite acting in a large number of gory films and television productions, Isabelle is uneasy with the sight of real blood.

In 2003, Isabelle almost died from a viral infection that caused a lung collapse and kidney failure. She fell into a coma and had to be treated with a ventilator. Isabelle made this revelation in 2020, on her Instagram account.

Career
Isabelle has been credited under several stage names during the course of her career.

She began her acting career at the age of eight as Katie Murray, playing an episodic role in the television series MacGyver in 1989. Then she continued to act in small episodic roles in television series and films such as: Cold Front, Immediate Family, The Last Winter, Burning Bridges, Children of the Dust, Salt Water Moose, and Married to a Stranger.

Isabelle has worked with her half-brother Joshua Murray in Cold Front and The Last Winter. In 1998, she worked with her father Graeme Murray on an episode of The X-Files titled "Schizogeny".

In 1998, there were big changes in Isabelle's career when she played Lindsay Clark in the film Disturbing Behavior, where Katie Holmes, James Marsden, and Nick Stahl became her film partners.

She first found fame with the role of Ginger Fitzgerald in the film Ginger Snaps, directed by John Fawcett; actress Emily Perkins became her co-star in the film as Brigitte Fitzgerald. Casting took place in Los Angeles, New York, Toronto, Montreal, and Vancouver. Isabelle auditioned on the same day as Perkins at their agency in Vancouver, reading to one another off-camera. Screenwriter Karen Walton said that they were exactly as she had pictured the characters when their taped auditions had arrived. The film tells how during the filming of an amateur horror film, the two sisters find themselves in the clutches of a huge monster, from the bites of one of the sisters on the body, there are strange wounds that heal quickly and suspiciously. From this point on, real problems begin for young heroines, the progress of development of which the viewer follows with intense attention.

What Culture said:

Obsessed with death and morbidity, and afraid of adulthood, Ginger Fitzgerald, portrayed by Katharine Isabelle of American Mary fame, only gets worse when she's bitten by a lycanthrope and the transformation into a wolf begins. She gradually becomes aggressive and over-sexualised, loses her relationship with her sister, grows pointy teeth and sprouts hair in really weird places. She even grows a tail that she actually attempts to cut off. It takes a big set of cojones to try to cut off any body part. Ultimately though, the film is interesting because it examines the dichotomy between Ginger's humanity and her animalistic side.

Jessica Roakes of The Toast also mentions the metaphorical nature of the character saying "Ginger’s body has betrayed her by menstruating. This is a key tenet of the body-horror genre — the monstrous comes not just from the outside, but from within the human body, from infection or perversion or unwanted biological functions. In Ginger’s case, it is her metamorphosis from girl to woman that renders her monstrous."

The actress also portrayed Ginger in the sequel Ginger Snaps 2: Unleashed (2004) and the prequel Ginger Snaps Back: The Beginning.

Two years later, Isabelle appeared in the film Insomnia. In this detective thriller directed by Christopher Nolan, the actress played along with Al Pacino, Robin Williams and Hilary Swank. In 2012, Isabelle starred in the horror film twins Jen and Sylvia Soska American Mary. American Mary premiered at the London FrightFest Film Festival on August 27, 2012. It received a limited theatrical run in the U.S. on May 31, 2013, and became available on video on demand on May 16, 2013. This role brought her many awards at various horror film festivals, including the "Fangoria Chainsaw Awards".

In 2008, Isabelle received the Gemini Award for Best Performance by an Actress in a Featured Supporting Role in a Dramatic Program or Mini-Series for her role in The Englishman's Boy. She later reunited with Perkins in Another Cinderella Story where they played the daughters of Jane Lynch's character.

Cooperation with the gothic sisters continued in 2014 when Isabelle played a major role in their 2006 horror sequel, See No Evil 2. Later, she played a major role in the thriller Primate. In 2015, the film 88 starred Isabelle, after she played a cameo role in the film The Girl in the Photographs.

Also, she played a small role in the short film Iteration 1 and one of the main roles in the action film Countdown in 2016. In 2019, Isabelle was cast as Vera Stone in the Netflix horror-drama series, The Order.

Filmography

Film

Television films

Television

Awards and nominations

References

External links

 
 

1981 births
Living people
20th-century Canadian actresses
21st-century Canadian actresses
Actresses from Vancouver
Canadian child actresses
Canadian film actresses
Canadian television actresses
Canadian people of Scottish descent
Best Supporting Actress in a Television Film or Miniseries Canadian Screen Award winners